John I, Count of Sponheim-Kreuznach (born 1245-1250; 28 January 1290)  was a German nobleman. As eldest son he succeeded his father Simon I and was himself succeeded by his eldest son Simon II.

House of Sponheim
13th-century births
1290 deaths